Charles Tilson-Chowne (born 1881) was a British stage and film actor.

Biography
He was born in 1881 in Harrow, Middlesex, England to James Henry Tilson Chowne and Rose Alice Pope.

Selected filmography
The Four Just Men (1921)
A Dear Fool (1921)
The Loudwater Mystery (1921)
In Full Cry (1921)
The Marriage Lines (1921)
Sinister Street (1922)
 The Game of Life (1922)

References

External links

Date of birth unknown
Date of death unknown
English male silent film actors
20th-century English male actors
English male stage actors
People from Harrow on the Hill
20th-century British male actors
1881 births
Male actors from London